Vadzim Lialin (born 15 November 1982) is a Belarusian rower. He won the silver medal in the coxless four at the 2016 European Rowing Championships.

References

External links

Belarusian male rowers
1982 births
Living people
Olympic rowers of Belarus
Rowers at the 2008 Summer Olympics
Rowers at the 2012 Summer Olympics
Rowers at the 2016 Summer Olympics
European Rowing Championships medalists